The Manfred Lachs Space Law Moot Court Competition or Lachs Space Moot is a space law moot competition organised by the International Institute of Space Law. The competition is named after Manfred Lachs, a former judge of the International Court of Justice. It is the oldest student competition in the area of space law, with the first edition of the moot taking place in 1993. In 2011, another space law moot came about, organised by the International Air & Space Law Academy. It is a different moot that is much smaller in scale.

As the class-leading moot in its field and given its scale, the Lachs Moot is considered one of the major moots. To date, five regional competitions have been held—Africa, Asia-Pacific, Europe, Latin America, and North America—with the winners of each region proceeding to the international finals at a venue that changes every year; the championship round is typically judged by sitting ICJ judges. For the 2020 edition, the regional rounds were held online due to the Covid-19 pandemic.

In each oral round there is an applicant and a respondent, and each side is represented by two counsel. Each team also has to submit written memorials for both sides.

References

Moot court competitions